Shirley Ximena Hopper Russell (May 16, 1886 – February 6, 1985), also known as Shirley Marie Russell, was an American artist best known for her paintings of Hawaii and her still lifes of Hawaiian flowers.  She was born Shirley Ximena Hopper in Del Rey, California, in 1886.  She graduated in 1907 from Stanford University, where she discovered art.  Shirley married Lawrence Russell, an engineer, in 1909.  When he died in 1912, she began teaching in Palo Alto, and dabbling in painting.  In 1921, she and her son came to Hawaii for a visit and decided to stay.  She studied under Hawaiian artist Lionel Walden during the 1920s and traveling to Europe several times to further her art education.  She studied in Paris during the 1930s and the cubist influence can be seen in a number of her works.  She taught art at President William McKinley High School in Honolulu for more than 20 years.  Around 1935-1936, the Japanese publisher Watanabe Shozaburo (1885–1962) published more than several woodblock prints she designed.  The majority of these prints depict colorful and detailed tropical flowers, while at least one print, Carmel Mission, is a California landscape.
 
In the course of her art career, Russell had three one-woman exhibitions at the Honolulu Museum of Art, and taught art at the University of Hawaii and the Honolulu Museum of Art.  She launched many young artists on their careers when they were her students at McKinley High School, including Satoru Abe  (1926-) and John Chin Young (1909–1997).  Although she painted in representational style herself, she was a staunch supporter of abstract art, and did some abstract work herself throughout her career.  She continued to paint almost daily until her death in Honolulu in 1985, at the age of 98.

The Hawaii State Art Museum, Honolulu Museum of Art, Isaacs Art Center, and Tokyo National Museum are among the public collections holding works by Shirley Russell.

References
 Department of Education, State of Hawaii, Artists of Hawaii, Honolulu, Department of Education, State of Hawaii, 1985, pp. 61–66.
 Ellis, George R. and Marcia Morse, A Hawaii Treasury, Masterpieces from the Honolulu Academy of Arts, Tokyo, Asahi Shimbun, 2000, 156, 225.
 Forbes, David W., "Encounters with Paradise: Views of Hawaii and its People, 1778-1941", Honolulu Academy of Arts, 1992, 210-146.
 Forbes, David W., He Makana, The Gertrude Mary Joan Damon Haig Collection of Hawaiian Art, Paintings and Prints, Hawaii State Foundation of Culture and the Arts, 2013, pp. 50–57 & 76-77
 Haar, Francis and Neogy, Prithwish, "Artists of Hawaii: Nineteen Painters and Sculptors", University of Hawaii Press, 1974, 104-111.
 Hartwell, Patricia L. (editor), Retrospective 1967-1987, Hawaii State Foundation on Culture and the Arts, Honolulu, Hawaii, 1987, p. 63
 Papanikolas, Theresa and DeSoto Brown, Art Deco Hawai'i, Honolulu, Honolulu Museum of Art, 2014, pp. 101–103
 Sandulli, Justin M., Troubled Paradise: Madge Tennent at a Hawaiian Crossroads, Durham, NC: Duke University, 2016
 Yoshihara, Lisa A., Collective Visions, 1967-1997, [Hawaii] State Foundation on Culture and the Arts, Honolulu, Hawaii, 1997, 25.
Hustace, James J.  Painters and Etchers of Hawaii-A Biographical Collection-1780-2018, Library of Congress (C)

Footnotes

External links
Shirley Russell Artists of Hawaii: Season 1, Episode 9 (PBS Hawaii: 1984)

20th-century American painters
American women painters
1886 births
1985 deaths
Printmakers from Hawaii
20th-century American women artists
American women printmakers
20th-century American printmakers